Makda Guroji Murah (Arabic: ماكدة مورة; born and died Aleppo, Syria; 1956 - 2018) was a Syrian actress. In 1994, Murah joined the Artists Syndicate and began acting in Aleppo theaters, including the National Theater, the Hour and Funny Theater, and the Aleppo Workers' Union.

Murah acted in many dramas, including People Without People, Night Travelers, Birds of Thorns, and Beautiful and Beautiful Diary. She also starred in the film Dreamy Vision in 2003.

References

1956 births
2018 deaths
People from Aleppo
Syrian Maronites
20th-century Syrian actresses
21st-century Syrian actresses